In condensed matter physics, Lindhard theory is a method of calculating the effects of electric field screening by electrons in a solid. It is based on quantum mechanics (first-order perturbation theory) and the random phase approximation. It is named after Danish physicist Jens Lindhard, who first developed the theory in 1954. 

Thomas–Fermi screening and the plasma oscillations can be derived as a special case of the more general Lindhard formula. In particular, Thomas–Fermi screening is the limit of the Lindhard formula when the wavevector (the reciprocal of the length-scale of interest) is much smaller than the Fermi wavevector, i.e. the long-distance limit. The Lorentz–Drude expression for the plasma oscillations are recovered in the dynamic case (long wavelengths, finite frequency).

This article uses cgs-Gaussian units.

Formula 
The Lindhard formula for the longitudinal dielectric function is given by
{|cellpadding="2" style="border:2px solid #ccccff"
| 
|}
However this Lindhard formula is valid also for nonequilibrium distribution functions. It can be obtained by first-order perturbation theory and the random phase approximation (RPA).

Limiting cases 
To understand the Lindhard formula, consider some limiting cases in 2 and 3 dimensions. The 1-dimensional case is also considered in other ways.

Long wavelength limit 
In the long wavelength limit, Linhard function reduces to 
 
For two-dimensional systems, 
.

This result recovers the plasma oscillations from the classical dielectric function from Drude model and from quantum mechanical free electron model.

For the denominator of the Lindhard formula, we get

 ,

and for the numerator of the Lindhard formula, we get

 .

Inserting these into the Lindhard formula and taking the  limit, we obtain

 ,

First, consider the long wavelength limit.

For the denominator of the Lindhard formula,

 ,

and for the numerator,

 .

 

Static limit 

Consider the static limit.

The Lindhard formula becomes
 .

Inserting the above equalities for the denominator and numerator, we obtain

 .
Assuming a thermal equilibrium Fermi–Dirac carrier distribution, we get
 

Therefore, 
 

Here,  is the 3D screening wave number (3D inverse screening length) defined as .Then, the 3D statically screened Coulomb potential is given by
 .

And the inverse Fourier transformation of this result gives
 
known as the Yukawa potential.

For a degenerated Fermi gas (T=0), the Fermi energy is given by
,
So the density is 
.

At T=0, so .

Inserting this into the above 3D screening wave number equation, we obtain

{|cellpadding="2" style="border:2px solid #ccccff"
|.
|}

This result recovers the 3D wave number from Thomas–Fermi screening.

For reference, Debye–Hückel screening describes the non-degenerate limit case.

In two dimensions, the screening wave number is
{|cellpadding="2" style="border:2px solid #ccccff"
| 
|}

Note that this result is independent of n.

Consider the static limit.
The Lindhard formula becomes
 .

Inserting the above equalities for the denominator and numerator, we obtain

 .
Assuming a thermal equilibrium Fermi–Dirac carrier distribution, we get
 .
Therefore,
 

 is 2D screening wave number(2D inverse screening length) defined as.Then, the 2D statically screened Coulomb potential is given by
 .

It is known that the chemical potential of the 2-dimensional Fermi gas is given by

 ,

Experiments on one dimensional systems 
This time, consider some generalized case for lowering the dimension.
The lower the dimension is, the weaker the screening effect.
In lower dimension, some of the field lines pass through the barrier material wherein the screening has no effect.
For the 1-dimensional case, we can guess that the screening affects only the field lines which are very close to the wire axis.

In real experiment, we should also take the 3D bulk screening effect into account even though we deal with 1D case like the single filament. The Thomas–Fermi screening has been applied to an electron gas confined to a filament and a coaxial cylinder.

See also 
 Kohn anomaly
 Pomeranchuk instability
 Friedel oscillations

References

General 

Condensed matter physics